William Martin "Pickles" Dillhoefer (October 13, 1893 – February 23, 1922) was a Major League Baseball catcher for parts of the 1917–1921 seasons with the Chicago Cubs, Philadelphia Phillies and St. Louis Cardinals.

Dillhoefer was famously one-fourth of what is generally considered one of the worst trades in Phillies history: Dillhoefer was sent with Mike Prendergast from the Cubs to the Phillies in exchange for catcher Bill Killefer and Hall of Fame pitcher Grover Cleveland Alexander on December 11, 1917. Dillhoefer would appear in just eight games for the Phillies (though he would be traded to St. Louis, where he would play regularly for three years), while Alexander would win 183 games for the Cubs and Cardinals.

While his career was undistinguished, Dillhoefer was still young when he died from typhoid fever in the winter of 1921–1922.

Aside from his death at a young age, Dillhoefer was remembered for his colorful nickname, a play on dill pickles.

External links
Baseball Reference stats

See also
 List of baseball players who died during their careers

References

External links

Major League Baseball catchers
Chicago Cubs players
Philadelphia Phillies players
St. Louis Cardinals players
Baseball players from Ohio
1893 births
1922 deaths
Portsmouth Cobblers players
Milwaukee Brewers (minor league) players
Deaths from typhoid fever